The Iqama or Iqamah is the second call to Islamic Prayer, given immediately before prayer begins.  The iqama is given a more rapid and less sonorous rendering than the first call, the adhan, because it is intended merely to draw the attention of those already in the mosque, rather than to remind those outside the mosque to come in. The phrases of the iqama and the adhan are the same, though there are variations among sects in the preferred number of repetitions of the phrases.

Text 

The Hanafi and the Shia schools both use the same number of repetitions of the formula for both the Adhan and the Iqama, contrary to all the other Islamic schools.

According to the Malikis, everything is said as normal (Allahu Akbar - 2x, Ashadu ala ilaha illa Allah - 1x, Ashadu anna Muhammadur RasoolAllah - 1x, Hayya ala salah - 1x, Hayya alal falah - 1x ..... Allahu Akbar - 2x, La ilaha illa Allah) with the exeception of saying 'Qad qamati salah' only once.

Other uses of the term iqama
Iqāma is the maṣdar form of the fourth (causative) stem (stem 'af`ala) from the triliteral root Q-W-M, which relates to setting things up, carrying things out, existence, and assorted other meanings. The word iqāma itself is multivalent, but its most common meaning outside the inauguration of prayer is in the context of immigration law, referring to a long-term visa for a foreign national. In some cases, as in Egypt, it is a stamp on the foreigner's passport; in others (as in Morocco and Saudi Arabia) it is a separate identity document in the form of a plastic card.

See also

 Adhan
 Shahada
 Tashahhud
 Salawat
 Islamic honorifics
 Dhikr
 Tawhid
 Barechu - the Jewish call to prayer
 Church bells

References

External links
 Iqamah being recited before prayer in Mecca
 Call for prayers according to the five school of thought: A Shi'ite Encyclopedia

Salah
Salah terminology